Paynesville (sometimes Paynesward) is a suburb east of Monrovia, Liberia. It is geographically larger than the city of Monrovia and is expanding eastward along the Robertsfield Highway and northeastward beyond Red Light Market, one of the largest market areas in Liberia. Paynesville is often considered a part of the Greater Monrovia area. It was the location of the Paynesville Omega Transmitter, the highest structure of Africa, until the tower's demolition in 2011. The Liberia Broadcasting System is also located in Paynesville. The Liberian Judo Federation is based in Paynesville.

Neighborhoods
Paynesville has several neighborhoods, called "communities" by residents, which are notable for their unique names. Some communities include housing estates, older settlements, while others are named after landmarks, major boulevards/roads or local leaders, while others predate the street names altogether.

A.B. Tolbert Community
Duport Road
ELWA
Gobuychop
Grayja
Kendeja
Kenny Town
King Gray Town
Nizohn
Parker-Paint
Plofe
Police Academy
Red Light Market
Rehab Road
Peace Island
SD Cooper Road
Sinda Town
SKD Boulevard
Stephan Tolbert Estates
Wamba Town
GSA Road

Notable residents
C. Cyvette M. Gibson
 George M. Weah
 Joseph Boakai
Prince Johnson

References

Populated places in Liberia
Populated places established by Americo-Liberians
City corporations, townships and borough of the Greater Monrovia District